The Oath of Allegiance, etc. Act 1609 (7 Jac. 1, c. 6) was an Act of Parliament passed by the Parliament of England during the reign of James I. The Act ordered officers, ecclesiastical persons, Members of Parliament, lawyers and others to take the oath of allegiance or otherwise they would suffer penalties and disabilities. The Act also declared that no MP could enter the House of Commons without first taking the oath before the Lord Steward or his deputy.

Notes

Acts of the Parliament of England
1609 in English law